HMS Vesuvius was initially a Steam Vessel second class (later reclassed as a First Class Sloop) designed by Sir William Symonds, Surveyor of the Navy, and built at Sheerness. She was commissioned and participated in the bombardment of Acre in 1840, during the Russian War she was in the Black Sea and the Sea of Azov in 1855. Her last overseas posting was in the West Indies. She was sold for breaking in June 1865.

Vesuvius was the eleventh named vessel (spelt Vesuvius or Vesuve) since it was used for a 8-gun fireship, launched by Taylor of Cuckold's Point on 30 March 1691 and expended on 19 November 1693 at St Malo.

Construction
She was ordered on 12 March 1838 with her laid in September at Sheerness Dockyard. She was launched on 11 July 1839. She was completed for sea on 20 April 1840 at an initial cost of £39,505, including £21,707 for hull construction, £13,309 for her machinery and £4,389 for her fitting out.

She was initially commissioned in May 1840 under the command of Lieutenant William Simpson Blount, RN for trials then used as a transport.

Commissioned Service

First Commission
She was commissioned on 31 August 1840 under the command of Commander Thomas Henderson, RN for service in the Mediterranean. She was with the British squadron off the coast of Syria in November 1840. She participated in the bombardment of Acre on 3 November. Commander Erasmus Ommanney, RN took command on 23 August 1841. She returned to Home Waters paying off at Woolwich on 15 November 1844.

Second Commission
She was commissioned on 22 March 1845 under the command of Commander George William Douglas O'Callaghan, RN for service on the North America and West Indies Station. Lieutenant Herbert Grey Austen, RN assumed command on 19 February 1847. She returned to Home Waters paying off on 14 September 1848.

Third Commission
On March 22nd 1852 she was commissioned under Commander Frederick Lamport Barnard, RN, then recommissioned on 17 August 1853 under Commander Richard Ashmore Powell, RN for service in the Mediterranean. During the Russian War she was at the bombardment of Sevastopol on 11 October 1854. Commander Sherard Osborn, RN took command on 16 February 1855. After the occupation of Kertch, she participated in the naval excursion led by HMS Miranda into the Sea of Azov. On 6 June 1855, she was under the command of Commander Francis Marten, RN (borne in Royal Albert) and assigned as tender to HMS Royal Albert. Commander Edward George Hore, RN took command on 29 October 1855 and returned to the Mediterranean. She returned to Home Waters and paid off at Woolwich on 17 January 1856.

Fourth Commission
She commissioned for service on the West Coast of Africa under Commodore Charles Wise, RN as the Senior Officer's Ship, on 20 April 1857. She returned to Home Waters paying off at Deptford on 22 February 1860.

Fifth Commission
She was commissioned on 16 July 1862 under Captain Richard Vesey Hamilton, RN for service in the West Indies. Prior to her departure she had been fitted with an Armstrong 110-pounder gun. She returned to Home Waters and paid off at Portsmuth on 8 November 1864.

Disposition
She was sold in June 1865 to White of East Cowes, Isle of Wight. She was towed to Cowes on 10 November 1865 for breaking.

Notes

Citations

References
 Lyon Winfield, The Sail & Steam Navy List, All the Ships of the Royal Navy 1815 to 1889, by David Lyon & Rif Winfield, published by Chatham Publishing, London © 2004, 
 Winfield, British Warships in the Age of Sail (1817 – 1863), by Rif Winfield, published by Seaforth Publishing, England © 2014, e, Chapter 11 Steam Paddle Vessels, Vessels acquired since November 1830, Stromboli Class
 Colledge, Ships of the Royal Navy, by J.J. Colledge, revised and updated by Lt Cdr Ben Warlow and Steve Bush, published by Seaforth Publishing, Barnsley, Great Britain, © 2020, e  (EPUB)
 The New Navy List, conducted by Joseph Allen, Esq., RN, London: Parker, Furnivall, and Parker, Military Library, Whitehall, MDCCCXLVII
 The Navy List, published by His Majesty's Stationery Office, London

Paddle sloops of the Royal Navy
Sloop classes
1839 ships